Mick Gudra (born 1 January 2001) is a German footballer who plays as a centre-forward for TSV Steinbach Haiger.

Career
Gudra made his professional debut for Hannover 96 in the 2. Bundesliga on 12 December 2020, coming on as a substitute in the 85th minute for Hendrik Weydandt against 1. FC Heidenheim. The away match finished as a 1–0 loss for Hannover.

References

External links
 
 
 
 

2001 births
Living people
Sportspeople from Bonn
Footballers from North Rhine-Westphalia
German footballers
Germany youth international footballers
Association football forwards
Hannover 96 II players
Hannover 96 players
TSV Steinbach Haiger players
2. Bundesliga players
Regionalliga players